Corbyn is a surname and a given name. Notable people with the name include:

Surname
 Frederick Corbyn (1791–1853), British surgeon in India
 Jeremy Corbyn (born 1949), British politician and leader of the Labour Party 2015–2020
 Piers Corbyn (born 1947), British activist and conspiracy theorist, brother of Jeremy Corbyn
 Thomas Corbyn (chemist) (1711–1791), English chemist
Corbyn, Stacey & Company, which existed as Corbyn before 1772
 Thomas Corbyn (politician) (fl. 1410s), English member of parliament

Given name
 Corbyn Besson (born 1998), American singer, member of the band Why Don't We
 Corbyn Dolley (born 1987), South African cricketer
 Corbyn Morris (1710–1779), English official and economic writer
 Corbyn Smith (born 1998), Canadian sledge hockey player

See also

 Corban (disambiguation)
 Corben, a surname
 Corbijn, Dutch surname
 Corbin (disambiguation)